The Windward Coast was used to describe an area of West Africa located on the coast between Cape Mount and Assini, i.e. the coastlines of the modern states of Sierra Leone, Liberia and Ivory Coast, to the west of what was called the Gold Coast.  A related region was called the Pepper Coast or Grain Coast.

Culture 
The people of the Windward Coast were renowned for the rice and indigo cultivation.

The trans-Atlantic slave trade 
Coasts

References

Geography of Ghana
Geography of Ivory Coast
Geography of Liberia
Regions of West Africa